Ilya Leonidovich Zakharov (born 2 May 1991) is a Russian diver and politician. He is the 2012 Olympics gold medalist in 3 metre Springboard.

Career

Junior
In 2007, Zakharov debuted in international tournament in diving at the Lambertz-Printenspringen in Germany where he won gold in 10m platform, a pair of silver medal with Evgeny Kuznetsov in 3m Springboard Synchro and a bronze in 3m springboard.

In 2008, Zakharov won gold in 10m Platform at the Cup of Russia. He scored 456.70 points ahead of compatriot Victor Minibaev who scored 449.25. At the 2008 European Junior Championships in Minsk, Belarus, he won two gold medals (1m Springboard and 10m Platform) and a pair of silver medal with Igor Koryakin in 3m Synchro Springboard.
At the 2008 Junior World Championship, he won a pair of bronze medal with Igor Koryakin in 3m Synchro Springboard and silver medal in individual behind Chinese diver Wang Jihan.

Senior
In 2009, at the fourth stage of the Grand Prix in Montreal, Canada, Zakharov and Kuznetsov won the silver medal in 3m synchro springboard and in Budapest, Hungary at the European Youth Championships He won three gold medals, in individual events ( 3m Springboard and 10m Platform) as well as in 3m synchro springboard with Victor Minibaev.

In 2010, at the Rostov-on-Don Grand Prix in diving, Zakharov and Minibaev won the bronze medal and in Montreal, Canada at the Grand Prix in diving athlete paired with Evgeny Kuznetsov won the bronze medal in synchronized diving three-meter springboard. At the World Cup in Guangzhou, China, Zakharov and Minbaev won silver in synchronized diving behind Chinese divers Cao Yuan and Zhang Yanquan.

In 2011, at the World Championships, Zakharov won the silver medal in 3m Springboard and a pair of silver medal with Kuznetsov in 3m Spring Synchro.

In 2012,  he won the Olympic Gold medal in the Men's 3 metre springboard defeating Chinese divers Qin Kai and He Chong. He also won the silver medal in the Men's synchronized 3 metre springboard, alongside Evgeny Kuznetsov, and competed in the Men's synchronized 10 metre platform, with Victor Minibaev. Zakharov was awarded the FINA Male Diver of the Year of 2012.

In 2013, Zakharov won gold medal at the 2013 European Championships in 3 m Springboard and 3m Spring Synchro.

In 2016, Zakharov attempted to defend his Olympic gold medal in the Men's 3 metre springboard, but did not advance past the semifinal round after a failed dive that resulted in a score of zero.

At the 2017 World Aquatics Championships in Budapest, Hungary, the Russian won his first gold medal in 3 m synchronized springboard, with his partner Kuznetsov.

Politics
On 11 September 2022, Zakharov was elected to the Saratov Oblast Duma with the New People party during that year's regional elections.

References

Russian male divers
1991 births
Living people
Olympic divers of Russia
Divers at the 2012 Summer Olympics
Divers at the 2016 Summer Olympics
Olympic gold medalists for Russia
Olympic silver medalists for Russia
Olympic medalists in diving
Medalists at the 2012 Summer Olympics
World Aquatics Championships medalists in diving
Divers from Saint Petersburg
Universiade medalists in diving
Universiade gold medalists for Russia
Universiade silver medalists for Russia
Universiade bronze medalists for Russia
Medalists at the 2011 Summer Universiade
Medalists at the 2013 Summer Universiade
Medalists at the 2017 Summer Universiade
New People politicians